The Paglia is an Italian river and a tributary of the Tiber.

It rises on the southern slopes of Monte Amiata (1,738 m) on the Plain of Rena near the town of Abbadia San Salvatore. It flows through the provinces of Siena, Viterbo and Terni, and flows into the Tiber to the south-east of Orvieto. It is approximately 86 km long and its flow is highly seasonal. Its largest tributary is the Chiani.

Rivers of the Province of Siena
Rivers of the Province of Terni
Rivers of the Province of Viterbo
Rivers of Italy